Chios is one of the regional units of Greece. It is part of the region of North Aegean. The capital of the regional unit is the town of Chios. The regional unit consists of the islands of Chios, Psara, Oinousses and some smaller uninhabited islands (including Antipsara), all in the Aegean Sea.

Administration
The regional unit Chios is subdivided into 3 municipalities. These are (number as in the map in the infobox):

 Chios (1)
 Oinousses (2)
 Psara (3)

Prefecture

As a part of the 2011 Kallikratis government reform, the regional unit Chios was created out of the former prefecture Chios. The prefecture had the same territory as the present regional unit. At the same time, the municipalities were reorganised, according to the table below.

See also
 List of settlements in the Chios regional unit

References

External links

 Official Chios website—operated by Chios Prefecture (including tourist guide)

 
1915 establishments in Greece
2011 establishments in Greece
Ionian colonies
Prefectures of Greece
Regional units of the North Aegean
States and territories established in 2011